Georges Bizet (1838–1875), a French classical composer and pianist.

Bizet may also refer to:

People
Jean Bizet (born 1947), French politician
Marie Bizet (1905–1998), French actress and singer
Nathan Bizet (born 1997), French footballer

Places
 Bizet, Enticho, a town in Tigray
Le Bizet, a hamlet in Ploegsteert, Belgium

Other
Bizet (sheep), a breed of sheep
Bizet metro station, on the Brussels metro